Syedna Dawood Bin Maulai Ajab Shah Burhanuddin (died on 27 Rabi ul Aakhir 999 AH AH/1591 AD) in Ahmedabad, Gujarat, India was the 26th Da'i al-Mutlaq (Absolute Missionary) of the Dawoodi Bohra branch of Musta‘lī Islam.  He succeeded the 25th Dai Syedna Jalal Shamshuddin bin Hasan to the religious post.

Life
Syedna Dawood was born in the year 1523. After acquiring elementary education in Ahmedabad, he travelled to Yemen for further studies under Syedna Yusuf Najmuddin I. 

Upon returning to Ahmadabad, he served under Syedna Jalal Shamshuddin bin Hasan. In 1574, under persecution from Mohammad bin Taher Neherwali and local governor Meer Jahan, Syedna Jalal left Ahmadabad to Vadodara. In 1583, he moved to Kapadvanj and stayed over there for 3 months. 

During his tenure, some of the lost fortresses in Yemen were recaptured. Burial sites of previous dais were also identified in Hisne Afeda in 1578. 

Syedna Dawood's health declined after his leg was injured by a nail. He died at the age of 67.

Succession controversy
Syedna Dawood became Da'i al-Mutlaq in 975 AH /1539 AD. His period of Da'awat was from 975-999 AH/ 1568-1591 AD (23 Years).

As per Dawoodi and Alavi Bohra's Syedna Dawood bin Maulai Ajab Shah conferred Nass upon 27th Dai Syedna Dawood Bin Qutubshah, whereas Sulaymani's believe the nass was conferred upon Syedna Sulayman bin Hassan.

Gallery

References

Further reading 
Daftary, Farhad, The Ismaili, Their History and Doctrine (Chapter -Mustalian Ismailism-p. 300-310)
Lathan, Young, Religion, Learning and Science
Bacharach, Joseph W. Meri, Medieval Islamic Civilisation

Dawoodi Bohra da'is
Dawoodi Bohras
1591 deaths
Year of birth unknown
16th-century Ismailis
16th-century Islamic religious leaders